KBUU may refer to:

 KBUU-LP, a low-power radio station (99.1 FM) licensed to serve Malibu, California, United States
 Burlington Municipal Airport (Wisconsin) (ICAO code KBUU)